Elections to South Ribble Borough Council were held on 6 May 1976. The whole council was up for election and the Conservative Party expanded its majority. The election was held in new boundaries established in 1975.

Election result

|}

Ward Results

References
 The Elections Centre, South Ribble Borough Council Election Results (PDF)

1976 English local elections
1976
1970s in Lancashire